Jackson Historic District in Jackson, Louisiana, is a historic district roughly bounded by College Street, LA 952, Horton Street and Race Street.

It was deemed significant as a "surviving rural town center from the nineteenth and early twentieth centuries with banks, shops, residences, churches, warehouses and all manner of other buildings which might be expected in such a town.... But the historic area of Jackson is superior to most historic town centers because it is unusually well-preserved."

The district included 124 structures.  Of these, 29 buildings (24 percent) are Federal or Greek Revival built from 1815 to 1845.  Ten buildings (8 percent) are of a period spanning from 1845 to 1875, and includes three churches and a few late Greek Revival houses.  For 1875 to 1910, there are 15 buildings (13 percent), including Late Victorian and Queen Anne styles.  For 1910 to c.1930 there are 43 buildings (35 percent).  Twenty buildings (24 percent) are intrusions.

The  area was listed on the National Register of Historic Places on December 4, 1980. It includes the Centenary College which was individually listed on the National Register of Historic Places on April 19, 1979.

See also
Centenary College of Louisiana at Jackson
National Register of Historic Places listings in East Feliciana Parish, Louisiana

References

Geography of East Feliciana Parish, Louisiana
Historic districts on the National Register of Historic Places in Louisiana
National Register of Historic Places in East Feliciana Parish, Louisiana